Gyanema or Gya'nyima
() is a large plain at the border between the Zanda County and Burang County in western Tibet, which was once used for an annual market of Indo-Tibetan trade. The border has been sealed and the market shut down since the Sino-Indian War of 1962. At the present time, there is only a small settlement at the western edge of the plain called Xilanta, where China operates a military outpost.

Geography 

The Gynema plain lies between two tributaries of Lamchang Chu, one in the west that rises below the Darma Pass (and called Darma Yankti by the Indians) and another in the east that rises in the hills further east and forms a large lake called Gago Cuo or Gyanema Lake. At the top of the lake on a hillock there was a fort called Gyanemakhar, which is now in ruins. Lamchang Chu drains into the Sutlej river and flows west. Immediately to the south of the Gyanema plain is the basin of the Karnali River, which flows east. Thus the plain itself may be said to form the water divide between Sutlej and Karnali.

The Gyanema market was accessible from all the three Bhotiya valleys of Kumaon. The Joharis accessed it via the triple passes of Unta Dhura, Jainti and Kungribingri passes. The Darmiyas could use the Darma Pass. And, the Byansis of Kuthi Valley could access it via Lympiadhura.

On the Tibetan side, the Gyanema plain was roughly equidistant from the Daba Town and the Burang Town (also called Taklakot). Traders would bring their goods for the annual market from their normal residence. The Tibetan goods were salt, borax, wool, skins, cloth and utensils. They exchanged them for silver, wheat, rice, satoo, ghur, candied sugar, pepper, beads, and other Indian manufactures.

References

Bibliography
 
 
 

Zanda County
Populated places in Ngari Prefecture